Packky Sakonnaree ( born 7 January 1999) is a Thai luk thung singer from the Isan area. She debuted with the single "The Brothers".

Early life and music career
She was born in Sawang Daen Din District, Sakon Nakhon Province. She graduated from Sawangdaendin School and she is studying at Sakonnakhon Rajabhat University.

She started her music career in a school band. She covered many luk thung songs on the YouTube channel "Teub Nueng Studio" (เติบนึง สตูดิโอ) to bring attention to her singing. Sala Khunnawut, who is a songwriter under the Grammy Gold label, met her and led her to start on stage in late 2020.

She recorded the song "Phoo Bao Rod Hae Yae Look Sao Chao Phap", in collaboration with Monkaen Kaenkoon in April 2021. Her first single was "The Brothers" in September 2021. Other songs by her include "Job Huk Chabab Kway Kway" and "Sao Sawang Yang Love".

Discography

References

External links
 
 Popnable

1999 births
Living people
Packky Sakonnaree
Packky Sakonnaree
Packky Sakonnaree